Our Lady of the Isles (Gaelic: Moire ro Naomh nan Eilean or Bana Thighearna nan Eilean) is a sculpture of the Madonna and Child, on South Uist in the Outer Hebrides of Scotland.

The statue is situated on the western slopes of Ruabhal, a hill near the northern end of South Uist. It is to the east of the A865 road, and a paved path runs from the road to the statue.

The statue was commissioned following proposals from the Ministry of Defence for a large missile testing range. This would have covered much of Uist, and involved construction of a military town as well as facilities for building missiles. This caused concern it would destroy much of the island's way of life, culture and language. Resistance to the proposals was led by Canon John Morrison, the local parish priest. He commissioned and raised funds for the construction of the statue. The statue was completed in 1957, and dedicated in 1958.

The statue was designed by Hew Lorimer, and sculpted from granite. In 2007 the statue was listed as a Category B listed building.

References
Our Lady of the Isles - RC Diocese of Argyll & the Isles
Our Lady of the Isles - RCAHMS

South Uist
Outdoor sculptures in Scotland
Buildings and structures in the Outer Hebrides
Statues of the Madonna and Child
Category B listed buildings in the Outer Hebrides
1957 sculptures
Granite sculptures in the United Kingdom
Colossal statues in the United Kingdom